Gebi may refer to:

 Gēbì, the Chinese name of the Gobi desert
 Gebi, Georgia, a village in the country of Georgia
 Gebi railway station on the Chinese Qingzang Railway
 Gebi language (disambiguation), several languages
 Menelik Palace, formerly known as Gebi, a palace in Addis Abeba, Ethiopia
 Mike Gebhardt "Gebi" (born 1965), US windsurfer
 Aliyu Ibrahim Gebi (born 1975), Nigerian politician

See also 
 Ghebi dialect, a dialect of Hindko spoken in Pakistan